(plural ), Spanish for 'Peak' or 'Summit', is an element in various place and other names, most often in the forms  or .

By itself, Cumbre or Cumbres may refer to:

 Cumbre, an insect genus, of skippers in the family Hesperiidae

Places 

 Cumbre Nueva, a ridge on La Palma, Canary Islands (a territory of Spain)
 Cumbre Pass, another name of Uspallata Pass  Bermejo Pass, a mountain pass in the Andes that connects Santiago and Los Andes, Chile, with Mendoza, Argentina
 Cumbre Vieja, an active volcanic ridge (dormant since 1971) on La Palma, Canary Islands (a territory of Spain)
 Cumbre Vieja tsunami hazard, an assessed risk of landslide-caused tsunami that could originate from Cumbre Vieja
 Cumbres Institute is a group of Catholic, bilingual schools founded 1954 in Mexico, and now also established in Brazil, Chile, Spain, and Venezuela
 Cumbres Pass, a mountain pass in the San Juan Mountains in Colorado, US
 Cumbres and Toltec Scenic Railroad (C&TSRR), a narrow-gauge heritage railway running from Antonito, Colorado, through the Cumbres Pass and Toltec Gorge, to Chama, New Mexico

See also 
 La Cumbre (disambiguation) (also covers )
 , Latin American title of the 1974 jazz album Summit AKA Tango Neuvo by Astor Piazzolla and Gerry Mulligan